Tenabo is a city in the Mexican state of Campeche.
It is located in the north of the state, 35 km from the state capital Campeche, Camp., and 110 km from Mérida, Yucatán, along Federal Highway 180. It serves as the municipal seat for the municipality of the same name.

As of 2010, the city of Tenabo had a population of 7,543.

Climate

References
Link to tables of population data from Census of 2005 Instituto Nacional de Estadística, Geografía e Informática (INEGI)
Tenabo Enciclopedia de los Municipios de México (INAFED)
Ayuntamiento de Tenabo Official website 

Populated places in Campeche
Municipality seats in Campeche